The 1968 Arkansas gubernatorial election was held on November 5, when incumbent Republican Winthrop Rockefeller defeated former Speaker of the Arkansas House of Representatives Marion Crank by a small margin. Rockefeller was first elected in 1966, and was the first Republican to hold the office sinceReconstruction. , this is the last time that Chicot County and St. Francis County voted for the Republican candidate.

Background
Probably due to the crowded Democratic primary and allegations of nepotism cast upon Crank, aided by the recent full enfranchisement of African Americans who supported Rockefeller and his liberal reforms Rockefeller prevailed with a clear, though reduced, compared to 1966 margin.

Virginia Johnson was the wife of former Arkansas Supreme Court Justice James D. Johnson who, concurrently with her candidacy, unsuccessfully sought the Democratic nomination against J. William Fulbright in the Senate election.

Democratic primary
Candidates:
 Marion H. Crank, State Representative, former House Speaker, and President of Foreman Cement Company
 Virginia Johnson, Legal Secretary and wife of James D. "Justice Jim" Johnson, Democratic Nominee for Governor in 1966
 Ted Boswell, attorney
 Bruce Bennett, former Attorney General
 Frank Whitbeck, Insurance Executive
 Clyde Byrd, State Senator

Runoff

Election results

References

Gubernatorial
1968 United States gubernatorial elections
1968
November 1968 events in the United States